Concerto Piccolo is a live album by European jazz group the Vienna Art Orchestra recorded at the Zürich Jazz Festival in 1980 and released on the Hat ART label.

Reception

The Allmusic review stated: "Recorded live at the Zurich Jazz Festival in 1980, this was America's first taste of the wild abandon that is the Vienna Art Orchestra and expatriate Lauren Newton's glorious vocal instrument. This is a 13-piece big band led by the beautifully weird compositional, instructional, and arranging craziness of Mathias Rüegg. They trash and revere all traditions -- both historical and avant-garde at the same time -- while using them both along with carnival and circus music, classical forms and fugues, and French salon music. ... There are colors, harmonies, and polyphonal systems at work here that will be recalled as the glory years of Euro big-band jazz in the future, and the evocative timbral nature of Rüegg's compositions will be studied for decades to come. Truly, Concerto Piccolo is an amazing debut from a band that offers more than it could possibly receive".

Track listing
All compositions by Mathias Rüegg except where noted
 "Concerto Piccolo" – 15:25
 "Herzogstrasse 4" – 11:30
 "Jelly Roll, But Mingus Rolls Better" (Charles Mingus/Mathias Rüegg) – 12:45
 "Variations on "Am Hermineli Z'liab" – 12:25
 "Tango from Obango" – 12:20

Personnel
Mathias Rüegg − arranger, conductor 
Lauren Newton - voice
Karl Fian − trumpet
Herbert Joos − flugelhorn, baritone horn, alphorn, double trumpet
Christian Radovan − trombone
Billy Fuchs − tuba
Harry Sokal − soprano saxophone, tenor saxophone, flute
Wolfgang Puschnig − alto saxophone, flute, piccolo
Roman Schwaller − tenor saxophone, clarinet
Uli Scherer − piano, Fender piano
Stefan Bauer - vibraphone
Jürgen Wuchner − bass
Wolfgang Reisinger - percussion
Joris Dudli - drums

References

1981 live albums
Hathut Records live albums
Vienna Art Orchestra live albums